Mother's Blue Velvet Shoes is an album by American jazz saxophonist Ernest Dawkins' New Horizons Ensemble,  which was recorded live at Chicago's Velvet Lounge in 1997 and released on his own Dawk label.

Reception

The Down Beat review by Aaron Cohen states "What Dawkins shares with other notable Chicago improvisers is a dexterity on a number of reeds, as well as a skill in crafting compositions that are ideal for bands of like-minded navigators."

Track listing
All compositions by Ernest Dawkins except as indicated
 "10-16-if" – 9:49
 "Many Favors Part I" (Steve Berry) – 16:57
 "Many Favors Part II" (Steve Berry) – 7:32 
 "Mother's Blues Velvet Shoes" – 7:31
 "Proof That the Evidence was Missing Intro" – 6:39
 "Proof That the Evidence was Missing" – 18:46

Personnel
Ernest Dawkins – alto sax, tenor sax, percussion
Steve Berry – trombone, percussion
Ameen Muhammad - trumpet, percussion
Jeff Parker – electric guitar
Yosef Ben Israel – bass
Vincent Davis - drums
Kim Ransom - poetry

References

1998 live albums
Ernest Dawkins live albums